Energy in Austria describes energy and electricity production, consumption and import in Austria.

Overview

Renewable energy 

According to Austrian Environment Minister Nikolaus Berlakovich Austria has a target of 34% renewable energy by 2020 and 100% self-sufficiency in energy by 2050. In Austria will be 100,000 new green jobs up to 2020, Berlakovich hoped in the European Wind Energy Event 2013 by EWEA.

See also

Wind power in Austria
Climate change in Austria
Anti-nuclear movement in Austria

References

External links

 
Austria